Carex perprava is a tussock-forming species of perennial sedge in the family Cyperaceae. It is native to parts of Bolivia.

See also
List of Carex species

References

perprava
Plants described in 1908
Taxa named by Charles Baron Clarke
Flora of Bolivia